Windham is a census-designated place (CDP) in Judith Basin County, Montana, United States.

Windham is in the valley of Sage Creek, a northeast-flowing tributary of the Judith River, which continues north to the Missouri River.

The community was first listed as a CDP prior to the 2020 census.

Demographics

References 

Census-designated places in Judith Basin County, Montana
Census-designated places in Montana